María Gabriela de Faría Chacón (born 11 September 1992), is a Venezuelan actress and singer known for appearing in television series across South America. She has starred as Isabela "Isa" Pasquali in Nickelodeon's Isa TKM, as Mia Novoa in Nickelodeon's Grachi, and as Franky Andrade in Nickelodeon's Yo soy Franky. In 2019 she starred in Deadly Class as Maria Salazar, and in "A Very Moody Christmas" as Cora.

In January 2020, María Gabriela de Faría Chacón married Venezuelan actor Christian McGaffney.

Career
Faría began her acting career with the Venezuelan telenovela Ser bonita no basta, the teen drama Túkiti, crecí de una, and the soap opera Toda una dama.  In 2007, she was a co-host of the children's program La merienda from RCTV.

Her first major film, El paseo 2, with John Leguizamo, was released in December 2012. Her second film (and first in English), was Crossing Point. In 2012, de Faría participated on an album by P9, which was recorded in the United States. In 2013, she appeared in La virgen de la calle as Juana Pérez, with Juan Pablo Llano as Mauricio Vega.

Filmography

References

External links
 

21st-century Venezuelan actresses
Actresses from Caracas
Living people
21st-century Venezuelan women singers
Venezuelan film actresses
Venezuelan people of Portuguese descent
Venezuelan emigrants to Portugal
Venezuelan expatriates in the United States
Venezuelan telenovela actresses
Venezuelan television actresses
1992 births